Jonas Müller (born 19 November 1995) is a German professional ice hockey defenseman. He currently plays for Eisbären Berlin in the Deutsche Eishockey Liga (DEL). He competed for Germany in the 2018 Winter Olympics.

Playing career
Müller started playing hockey at the age of six. He joined his hometown club, Eisbären Berlin, at the junior level, playing through each junior level before making his professional debut in the Deutsche Eishockey Liga in the 2013–14 season. On 3 May 2018, Müller was signed to a one-year contract extension to remain in Berlin.

International play

Müller first appeared at an international tournament for Germany at the 2013 IIHF World U18 Championships.

Müller made his senior debut and was a member of the silver medal-winning 2018 German Olympic hockey team. He also represented Germany at the 2018 IIHF World Championship.

Career statistics

Regular season and playoffs

International

Awards and honors

References

External links

1995 births
Living people
Dresdner Eislöwen players
Eisbären Berlin players
German ice hockey defencemen
Ice hockey people from Berlin
Ice hockey players at the 2018 Winter Olympics
Medalists at the 2018 Winter Olympics
Olympic ice hockey players of Germany
Olympic medalists in ice hockey
Olympic silver medalists for Germany
Ice hockey players at the 2022 Winter Olympics